Capolago-Riva San Vitale railway station is a railway station in the Swiss canton of Ticino. The station is in the village of Capolago, part of the municipality of Mendrisio, but, as its name suggests, also serves the adjoining municipality of Riva San Vitale. The station is on the Swiss Federal Railways' Gotthard railway, between Lugano and Chiasso, and on the Monte Generoso railway, a rack railway to the summit of Monte Generoso.

The station features three platforms on the Gotthardbahn, whilst the Monte Generoso trains stop at a streetside location in front of the station. The single track to Monte Generoso leaves the station to the south, immediately climbing to a flyover over the main line, and also continues to the north serving the railway's car shed, workshops, and lakeside terminal stop. Until 1948, the street outside the station contained not only the  gauge tracks of the Monte Generoso railway, but also the  gauge tracks of the Mendrisio electric tramway, which linked Chiasso with Riva San Vitale via Mendrisio and Capolago.

Services 
 the following services stop at Capolago-Riva San Vitale:

AutoPostale buses serve stops outside the station, providing links to Arogno, Brusino Arsizio, Melano, Mendrisio, Porto Ceresio, Riva San Vitale and Rovio.

Gallery

References

External links 
 
 

Railway stations in Switzerland opened in 1874
Railway stations in Ticino
Swiss Federal Railways stations